The seventy-ninth Minnesota Legislature first convened on January 3, 1995. The 67 members of the Minnesota Senate were elected during the General Election of November 3, 1992, and the 134 members of the Minnesota House of Representatives were elected during the General Election of November 8, 1994.

Sessions 
The legislature met in a regular session from January 3, 1995, to May 22, 1995. A special session convened from May 23, 1995, to May 25, 1995, to consider funding for K-12 schools and other unfinished business.

A continuation of the regular session was held between January 16, 1996, and April 3, 1996.

Party summary 
Resignations and new members are discussed in the "Membership changes" section, below. On September 23, 1995, the Independent Republican Party changed its name back to the Republican Party.

Senate

House of Representatives

Leadership

Senate 
President of the Senate
Allan Spear (DFL-Minneapolis)

Senate Majority Leader
Roger Moe (DFL-Erskine)

Senate Minority Leader
Dean Johnson (R-Willmar)

House of Representatives 
Speaker of the House
Irv Anderson (DFL-International Falls)

House Majority Leader
Phil Carruthers (DFL-Brooklyn Center)

House Minority Leader
Steve Sviggum (R-Kenyon)

Members

Senate

House of Representatives

Membership changes

Senate

House of Representatives

Notes

References 

 Minnesota Legislators Past & Present - Session Search Results (Session 79, Senate)
 Minnesota Legislators Past & Present - Session Search Results (Session 79, House)

79th
1990s in Minnesota
1995 in Minnesota
1996 in Minnesota
1995 U.S. legislative sessions
1996 U.S. legislative sessions